Xenocalamus sabiensis, or the Sabi quill-snouted snake, is a species of venomous rear-fanged snake in the family Atractaspididae. It is endemic to Africa.

Geographic range
It is found in Mozambique, Republic of South Africa, and Zimbabwe.

References

Broadley, D.G. 1971. A revision of the African snake genera Amblyodipsas and Xenocalamus. Occasional Papers of the National Museums of Rhodesia. Volume 4, No. 33B, pp. 629–697.

Atractaspididae
Reptiles described in 1971